Eroica is the third album by Wendy & Lisa, released in 1990 by Virgin Records.

Album history
Wendy Melvoin's twin sister Susannah and Cole Ynda, Lisa's sister, contributed background vocal work to the record (as well as touring extensively with their sisters at the time) with k. d. lang adding background vocals to "Mother Of Pearl".

Singles released from the album included "Strung Out" (UK No. 44), "Rainbow Lake" (UK No. 70) and "Don't Try To Tell Me" (UK No. 83).

Although the original UK album contained 11 tracks like the US release, Virgin Records in Europe also issued a limited edition version with a bonus 3" cd Piano Improvisations with four tracks performed by Lisa Coleman. The album was reissued in the UK in 2017 by Cherry Red Records containing eleven bonus tracks.

Track listing
All tracks written by Wendy Melvoin and Lisa Coleman except where noted.

 "Rainbow Lake" – 4:42
 "Strung Out" – 4:13
 "Mother Of Pearl" (Coleman, Melvoin, Tony Berg, Michael Penn) – 5:11
 "Don't Try To Tell Me" (orchestrated by Michael Melvoin) – 4:43
 "Crack In The Pavement" – 3:25
 "Porch Swing" (music by Coleman, Melvoin, Chris Bruce, Carla Azar) – 5:25 
 "Why Wait For Heaven" (music by Coleman, Melvoin, Susannah Melvoin, Cole Ynda, Bruce, Azar) – 4:48
 "Turn Me Inside Out" (Coleman, Melvoin, Susannah Melvoin) – 4:32
 "Skeleton Key" (music by Coleman, Melvoin, Bruce, Susannah Melvoin, Azar, Ynda) – 4:12
 "Valley Vista" – 3:44
 "Staring At The Sun" – 4:20

Piano Improvisations - special limited edition bonus disc
"Minneapolis #1"
"Minneapolis #2"
"Eric's Ghost"
"C-Ya"

Cherry Pop/Virgin Special Edition bonus disc (UK, 2017)
"Strung Out (G-Strung 7")"
"Stones And Birth"
"Rainbow Lake (12 into 7 Remix)"
"Balance"
"Don't Try To Tell Me (Alternative Version)"
"Strung Out (G-Strung Mix)"
"Rainbow Lake (12" Mix)"
"Minneapolis #1"
"Minneapolis #2"
"Eric's Ghost"
"C-Ya"

Personnel
 Wendy Melvoin – lead and background vocals, guitars, bass, drums, programming, other instruments
 Lisa Coleman – lead and background vocals, all piano and keyboards, programming, other instruments
 Susannah Melvoin – background vocals
 Cole Ynda – background vocals
 Carla Azar – drums
 Chris Bruce – guitar
 Allen Kamai – bass
 k.d. lang – featured vocals
 David Coleman – electric cello 
 Tony Berg – hurdy-gurdy
 Eric Leeds – horns

Singles
 "Strung Out" 
 "Rainbow Lake"
 "Don't Try To Tell Me"

References

1990 albums
Albums produced by Tony Berg
Wendy & Lisa albums
Virgin Records albums